James M. Brown (born December 9, 1941) is a trial attorney in private practice in Salem, Oregon, who served as Oregon Attorney General from 1980 to 1981.  He is a Democrat.

Born in St. Paul, Minnesota, Brown attended American University before graduating Willamette University magna cum laude with a B.A. in 1964, and Yale Law School with an LL.B. in 1967, being admitted to the Oregon bar the same year.

He served as a Deputy District Attorney from 1970 to 1972, and as District Attorney from 1972 to 1977, in Benton County, Oregon.  He was Counsel to the Governor of Oregon (1977–1979) and Assistant Attorney General (1979–1980), before being appointed as state Attorney General in 1980.

References

 

1941 births
Oregon Attorneys General
Living people
Politicians from Saint Paul, Minnesota
Willamette University alumni
Oregon Democrats
Yale Law School alumni
Politicians from Salem, Oregon
District attorneys in Oregon
People from Benton County, Oregon
Lawyers from Salem, Oregon